Moorea-Maiao is a commune of French Polynesia, an overseas territory of France in the Pacific Ocean. The commune is in the administrative subdivision of the Windward Islands. At the 2017 census it had a population of 17,816.

Moorea-Maiao consists of the following associated communes:

The administrative centre of the commune is the settlement of Afareaitu, on the island of Moorea.

References

Communes of French Polynesia
Mo'orea